, born 1945 Beijing, China is a Japanese architect.

Education
Yamamoto completed his bachelor's degree from Nihon University in 1967 and his master's degree from the Tokyo University of the Arts in 1971, after which he continued his studies at the University of Tokyo under Hiroshi Hara.

Career
He founded the Yamamoto & Field Shop Co.Ltd in 1973. Yamamoto was a professor at Yokohama National University from 2000 to 2011 and at the Graduate school of Engineering of the Nihon University. He currently teaches at his alma mater Nihon University.
Some of his most representative works are the Rotunda Building (Yokohama, 1981); the Hamlet Building (Tokio, Shibuya-Ku, 1988), or the apartment blocks Ryukoentoshi (Yokohama, 1992)

Recognition
Under the many awards Riken Yamamoto has won, the most recent achieved by him are: The Japan Institute of Architects Award for the Yokosuka Museum of Art (2010) Building Contractors Society Prize for the Namics Techno Core (2010), Building Contractors Society Prize for the Yokosuka Museum of Art (2008) or the 25th Fukushima Architecture Culture Award, highest award for the Fukushima ecoms Pavilion, SUS Fukushima Factory (2007).

Selected works
 1975: Mihira House, Kanagawa Prefecture 
 1977: Shindo House, Kanagawa Prefecture; Yamakawa Villa 
 1978: Kubota House, Tokyo, Yamamoto House; Kanagawa Prefecture, Studio Steps, Kanagawa Prefecture
 1985: Omata House, Kanagawa Prefecture  
 1987: Daiko Dormitory, Kanagawa Prefecture; Marufuji (Kosaku store), Tokyo; ROTUNDA Kanagawa Prefecture
 1988: Hamlet Tokyo; Fujii Gallery, Tokyo 
 1996: Iwadeyama Junior High School, Miyagi Prefecture
 1999: Saitama Prefectural University; Saitama
 2000: Hiroshima West Fire Station, Hiroshima 
 2001: Tokyo Wells Technical Center, Shizuoka; 
 2002: D Clinic, Saitama
 2005: Future University Hakodate Research Building, Hokkaido; SUSTRG Office Project, Fukushima 
 2007: Yokosuka Museum of Art, Kanagawa Prefecture
 2008: Namics Techno Core, Niigata; Guan Yuan Housing, Beijing; Dragon Lily's House, Gunma
 2009: Utsunomiya University Center for Optics Research Tochigi 
 2012: Tianjin Library
 2018 (planned): The Circle at Zürich Airport

References

External links

Riken Yamamoto Official Website  
Riken Yamamoto l'hospitalier Le Journal des Arts 

Japanese architects
Educators from Beijing
Nihon University alumni
Academic staff of Nihon University
1945 births
Living people
Academic staff of Yokohama National University